Dokuz Eylül University (DEÜ) is a university in İzmir, Turkey. It was founded in 1982 and is organized in 15 faculties. DEU is the first university which applied the problem-based learning method in Turkey, beginning in the School of Medicine in 1997.

Several components of Dokuz Eylül University have attained a goal of continuous development in education, research and practice through the ISO 9001 2000 Quality Management System certificate: Social Sciences Institute and School of Maritime Business and Management (2001), University Presidency (2003) and Medical Faculty and Health Sciences Institute (2004).

History
Founded on 20 July 1982, the university's name ("September 9th") refers to 9 September 1922, the date of the Liberation of İzmir from the Greek occupation of the city, one of the final events of the Turkish War of Independence. Seventeen previously established schools, including some of the faculties of Ege University and other institutions of higher education, were affiliated with the university the same year. The university has fifteen faculties, five schools, six vocational schools, five graduate schools, and five research institutes.

Organization
There are 16 faculties into which the university is divided:

Faculty of Education
Faculty of Literature
Faculty of Science
Faculty of Fine Arts
Maritime Faculty
Faculty of Engineering
Faculty of Law
Faculty of Economics and Administrative Sciences
Faculty of Theology
Faculty of Business
Faculty of Architecture
Faculty of Medicine
Faculty of Dental Medicine
Faculty of Nursing
Faculty of Tourism
Faculty of Health Sciences

Campus sites

İnciraltı (Faculty of Medicine; University Hospital; Facult of Dental Medicine; School of Physical Therapy and Rehabilitation; School of Nursing; Institute of Health Science; Vocational School of Health Services; International Biomedicine and Genome Institute (iBG-Izmir); Institute of Oncology)
Alsancak (Administrative building, lifelong education facility)
Buca-Efeler (Faculty of Education, Izmir Vocational School)
Buca-Dokuzceşmeler (Faculty of Economics and Administrative Sciences; Faculty of Law; Vocational School of Judicial Practices; Buca Faculty of Education; İzmir Vocational School; Institute of Educational Sciences; School of Foreign Languages)
Buca-Tınaztepe (Faculty of Sciences; Faculty of Business; Institute of Social Sciences; Faculty of Architecture; Faculty of Engineering; Maritime Faculty; Faculty of Fine Arts; School of State Conservatory Institute of Fine Arts)
Hatay (Faculty of Theology; Vocational School of Religion; Institute of Religious Studies)
Torbalı (Torbalı Vocational School)
Urla (Maritime Faculty)
Seferihisar (Faculty of Engineering; Department of Geophysics and Geological Engineering)
Foça (Reha Midilli Tourism School)

Notable alumni
 Didem and Sinem Balık, (State conservatory) identical twin opera singers
 Vahide Perçin, actress
 Emre Aydın, rock singer
 Engin Altan Düzyatan, actor
 Öner Erkan, actor
 Şenay Gürler, actress
 Zafer İlken, academic and rector of İzmir Institute of Technology
 Bülent İnal, actor
 Cengiz Küçükayvaz, actor
 Semih Kaplanoğlu, screenwriter, film director and producer
 Betül Cemre Yıldız, female chess player
İbrahim Karagül, Turkish journalist

See also 
 Balkan Universities Network
 List of universities in İzmir

References

External links
Dokuz Eylül University Website 
English
University Catalog
Sayılarla Dokuz Eylül Üniversitesi

 
Universities and colleges in İzmir
Educational institutions established in 1982
1982 establishments in Turkey